Run for the Roses (also known as The Thoroughbreds) is a 1977 American drama film about horse-racing directed by Henry Levin and starring Vera Miles, Stuart Whitman and Panchito Gómez.

Plot
A young boy named Juanito Hernandez befriends and nurses back to health a horse that undergoes an operation. When the horse recovers, owner Clarissa Stewart and her trainer, Charlie, come to believe Juanito's hunch that the recovered horse now has a good chance to win the Kentucky Derby.

Cast
 Panchito Gómez as Juanito Hernandez
 Vera Miles as Clarissa Stewart
 Stuart Whitman as Charlie
 Henry Brandon as Jeff
 Lisa Eilbacher as Carol
 Sam Groom as Jim
 James Murphy as Eddie

External links

References

1977 films
1970s sports drama films
American sports drama films
American horse racing films
Films directed by Henry Levin
1977 drama films
1970s English-language films
1970s American films